Kelspoke Castle is a ruined castle overlooking Kilchattan Bay, Isle of Bute, Scotland. Only a small amount of the ruins are above ground.

Notes

Ruined castles in Argyll and Bute